The 1860 United States presidential election in Tennessee took place on November 6, 1860, as part of the 1860 United States presidential election. Tennessee voters chose 12 representatives, or electors, to the Electoral College, who voted for president and vice president.

Tennessee was won by the Senator John Bell (CU–Tennessee), running with the 15th Governor of Massachusetts Edward Everett, with 47.72 percent of the popular vote, against the 14th Vice President of the United States John Breckenridge (SD–Kentucky), running with Senator Joseph Lane, with 44.55 percent of the popular vote and Senator Stephen A. Douglas (D–Illinois), running with 41st Governor of Georgia Herschel V. Johnson, with 7.72 percent of the popular vote.

Republican Party candidate and president-elect Abraham Lincoln was not on the ballot in Tennessee. Tennessee was the only one of ten states where Lincoln was not on the ballot that would be carried by a candidate other than Breckinridge. Nonetheless, this is the last election in which Unionist Cocke County and Hancock County were not carried by the Republican presidential nominee.

Results

References

Tennessee
1860
1860 Tennessee elections